Canoeing (Spanish: Canotaje), for the 2013 Bolivarian Games, took place from 17 November to 19 November 2013.

Medal table
Key:

Men's events

Women's events

References

Events at the 2013 Bolivarian Games
2013 in canoeing
2013 Bolivarian Games